The New Dark Age is the third studio album by the Finnish heavy metal band Kiuas. The album was released through Spinefarm Records on March 12, 2008 for Finland with new dates to be announced for other areas. The song, "Conqueror", directed by Owe Lingwall was shot as a music video on February 18, 2008. "Of Sacrifice, Loss and Reward" was released on February 20 as a single in Finland and topped the Finnish charts at number 1. The single will include two other songs and a Japanese bonus track exclusively to the single and Japan only. The album cover was designed by Niklas Sundin of Cabin Fever Media, and guitarist for Dark Tranquillity. It is of an original renaissance woodcut illustration with the portrayal of Kiuas' band members as the "five" Horsemen of the Apocalypse. A second music video for "The Decaying Doctrine" was again directed by Owe Lingwall.

Track listing 
 All Songs Written By Mikko Salovaara, except where noted.
 "The Decaying Doctrine" – 4:55
 "Conqueror" – 5:06
 "Kiuas War Anthem" – 4:36 (Ilja Jalkanen, Salovaara)
 "The New Dark Age" – 5:03
 "To Excel and Ascend" – 5:55
 "Black Rose Withered" – 3:50
 "After the Storm" – 5:40 (Jalkanen, Salovaara)
 "Of Sacrifice, Loss and Reward" – 4:42 (Jalkanen, Salovaara)
 "The Summoning" – 4:58 (Jalkanen, Salovaara)
 "The Wanderer's Lamentation" – 6:45
 "Towards the Hidden Sanctum" (Japanese bonus track) – 5:25
 "Electric Crown" (UK bonus track; Testament cover) (Chuck Billy, Eric Peterson, Alex Skolnick) – 5:23
 "Sailing Ships" (UK bonus track; Whitesnake cover) (David Coverdale, Adrian Vandenberg) – 6:14

Personnel 
Kiuas
 Ilja Jalkanen – vocals, choir
 Mikko Salovaara – guitars, vocals, choir, Narration
 Atte Tanskanen – keyboard, choir
 Teemu Tuominen – bass guitar
 Markku Näreneva – drums

Additional musicians
 "J", Aleksi Parviainen, Pasi Rantanen, Pekka Heino: Choir
 Anna-Maija Jalkanen: Additional Vocals on track 7
 Jussi Reijonen: Oud on tracks 5 & 10

Production
 Arranged By Kiuas
 Produced By Nino Laurenne, Mikko Salovaara & Janne Joutsenniemi
 Recorded & Engineered By Nino Laurenne
 Mixed By Mikko Karmila
 Pro-Tools Editing By Aksu Hanttu
 Mastered By Svante Forsback

References

External links 
 "The New Dark Age" at discogs

2008 albums
Kiuas albums
Spinefarm Records albums